Deiningen is a municipality in the district of Donau-Ries in Swabia, Bavaria in Germany.

References

Donau-Ries